Bellis is a surname. Notable people with the surname include:

 Alf Bellis (1920–2013), English footballer
 Antonio de Bellis (c. 1616 – c. 1656), Italian painter
 Benjamin N. Bellis (1924-2019), United States Air Force officer
 Charlotte Bellis, New Zealand journalist 
CiCi Bellis (born 1999), American tennis player
 Gavin Bellis (born 1973), Australian rower
 George Bellis (1904–1969), English footballer
 Guy Bellis (1886–1980), English actor
 Jonathan Bellis (born 1988), Manx cyclist
 Joseph H. Bellis (1867–1920), American politician
 Richard Roe Bellis (1964), American film and television music composer
 Scott Bellis, Canadian actor and film director